Máo Jiànqīng (born August 8, 1986) is a former Chinese international football player.

Club career
Mao Jianqing started his professional football career in 2004 with Shanghai Shenhua after graduating from their youth team. He made his debut in a league game against Shenyang Ginde on June 13, 2006 in a 0-0 draw where he came on as a substitute. In his first season for Shenhua he played in four league games; however, he did not score his first goal and establish himself for them until the 2006 season where he was a significant part of the team that came second in the Chinese Super League. The following seasons saw his speed, strength, confidence, strong shot and intelligent ball control make him one not only the club's first choice winger but also the national team. 

In December 2008 Mao Jianqing was arrested for his involvement in a bloody restaurant brawl in the city where a local man was beaten and two women were hurt. The fight started in an apparent fit of jealousy over a woman and came hours after the Shenhua team suffered a disappointing tie that cost them the league title. After being held in custody for one week and making a public apology, Mao was allowed to return to Shenhua. His public assault charge saw him dropped from the team, although he briefly regained his place within the team until the transfer window opened and he was loaned out to Shenzhen Asia Travel for the remainder of the season.

A permanent transfer to Shaanxi Baorong Chanba occurred on 12 February 2010. He was loaned out to Hangzhou Greentown and later transferred to Beijing Guoan in 2012. He was loaned to Shanghai Shenxin in July 2013. In February 2014, Mao was loaned to Qingdao Jonoon until the end of the 2014 season. On 26 January 2015, Mao transferred to fellow Chinese Super League side Shijiazhuang Ever Bright. 

On 1 December 2016, Mao rejoined his former club Shanghai Shenhua. The move would see him go on to re-establish himself as an integral part of the team and see him win his first piece of silverware when the club won the 2017 Chinese FA Cup. The following season saw Mao's game time significantly reduced after a flare-up on his left knee from previous injury required him to have surgery. With persistent injuries on both his legs, Mao would announce his retirement from playing on 4 March 2020 and that he would looking to move into coaching.

International career
Mao Jianqing was included in the under-23 squad to play Football at the 2006 Asian Games in Doha; however, he missed the tournament due to injury. Mao Jianqing still went on to join the senior team and made his debut against Palestine in a 2-0 win on October 11, 2006 where he also scored to send them to China to the 2007 AFC Asian Cup finals. Under the head coach Zhu Guanghu he became the first choice left-winger within the Chinese team and was included in the Asian Cup Cup tournament. Within that campaign he started in all of China's games where they were knocked out in the group stages and scored his only goal of the tournament against Iran in their 2-2 draw.

Career statistics

Club 
Statistics accurate as of match played 31 December 2019.

International goals
Scores and results list China's goal tally first.

Honours

Club
Shanghai Shenhua
Chinese FA Cup: 2017

References

External links

 

1986 births
Living people
Association football wingers
Chinese footballers
Footballers from Shanghai
China international footballers
Shanghai Shenhua F.C. players
Shenzhen F.C. players
Beijing Renhe F.C. players
Zhejiang Professional F.C. players
Beijing Guoan F.C. players
Shanghai Shenxin F.C. players
Qingdao Hainiu F.C. (1990) players
Cangzhou Mighty Lions F.C. players
Chinese Super League players
China League One players
2007 AFC Asian Cup players